Josef Ritz (14 December 1899 – 31 July 1943) was an Austrian fencer. He competed in the individual foil event at the 1936 Summer Olympics.

He fought in the Wehrmacht and was killed on the Eastern Front, near Kharkov in 1943 during World War II.

References

External links
 

1899 births
1943 deaths
Austrian male foil fencers
Olympic fencers of Austria
Fencers at the 1936 Summer Olympics
Fencers from Vienna
Austrian military personnel of World War II
Austrian military personnel killed in World War II